Blair James Stewart (born March 15, 1953) is a Canadian former professional ice hockey player.

Stewart was born in Winnipeg, Manitoba. Drafted in 1973 by the Detroit Red Wings of the National Hockey League (NHL), Stewart played for Detroit and also for the Washington Capitals and Quebec Nordiques. In 2013, Stewart, along with nine other former NHL players, sued the league for negligence in protecting players from concussions.

Career statistics

Regular season and playoffs

References

External links
 
 Profile at HockeyDraftCentral.com

1953 births
Living people
Canadian ice hockey forwards
Detroit Red Wings draft picks
Detroit Red Wings players
Fort Worth Texans players
Hershey Bears players
Houston Apollos players
Quebec Nordiques players
Ice hockey people from Winnipeg
Springfield Indians players
Syracuse Firebirds players
Virginia Wings players
Washington Capitals players
Winnipeg Jets (WHL) players